Physokentia is a genus of flowering plant in the palm family, native to certain islands of the western Pacific.

Description 
This genus contains the following species: The relationships between Physokentia and some other genera of the tribe Basseliniinae particularly the New Caledonia endemic Burretiokentia and Cyphophoenix are not clear.

List of species
 Physokentia avia H.E.Moore - Bismarck Archipelago
 Physokentia dennisii H.E.Moore - Solomon Islands
 Physokentia insolita H.E.Moore - Solomon Islands
 Physokentia petiolata (Burret) D.Fuller - Fiji
 Physokentia tete (Becc.) Becc. - Vanuatu
 Physokentia thurstonii (Becc.) Becc. - Vanuatu
 Physokentia whitmorei H.E.Moore - Solomon Islands

References

 
Arecaceae genera
Taxa named by Odoardo Beccari
Taxonomy articles created by Polbot